The 2012 Supertaça de Angola (25th edition) was contested by Recreativo do Libolo, the 2011 Girabola champion and Petro de Luanda, the 2011 Angola cup winner. It was the last such competition to be played in a two leg format. On home court, Petro beat Libolo 1–0 to secure their 1st title as the away match in Calulo ended in a draw.

Match details

First Leg

Second Leg

See also
 2011 Angola Cup
 2011 Girabola
 Interclube players
 Recreativo do Libolo players

External links
 Match photos

References

Supertaça de Angola
Super Cup